The IT Army of Ukraine is a volunteer cyberwarfare organisation created at the end of February 2022 to fight against digital intrusion of Ukrainian information and cyberspace after the beginning of the Russian invasion of Ukraine on February 24, 2022. The group also conducts offensive cyberwarfare operations, and Chief of Head of State Special Communications Service of Ukraine Victor Zhora said its enlisted hackers would only attack military targets.

Formation 
On 26 February 2022, the Minister of Digital Transformation and First Vice Prime Minister of Ukraine, Mykhailo Fedorov announced the creation of the IT Army, which is mainly coordinating its efforts via Telegram and Twitter.

According to Reuters, the Ukrainian government asked for volunteers from the country's hacker underground to help protect critical infrastructure and conduct cyber spying missions against Russian troops. Yegor Aushev, the co-founder of a Ukrainian cybersecurity firm Hacken, wrote, "Ukrainian cybercommunity! It's time to get involved in the cyber defense of our country," asking hackers and cybersecurity experts to submit an application listing their specialties, such as malware development and professional references.

Aims 
The volunteers who joined the group are divided into offensive and defensive cyber units. While the offensive volunteer unit would help Ukraine's military conduct digital espionage operations against invading Russian forces, the defensive unit would be employed to defend infrastructure such as power plants and water systems.

The Ukrainian government used Twitter and Telegram to share a list of Russian and Belarusian targets for the army to attack. Russian ransomware operators responded by offering their assistance to counter the Ukrainian effort.

Activities 

 Fedorov requested the assistance of cyber specialists and tweeted a Telegram with a list of 31 websites of Russian business and state organizations.
 On 28 February 2022, the IT Army hacked the website of the Moscow Stock Exchange. The IT Army posted that it had taken them only five minutes to render the website inaccessible.
 On the same day, the IT Army hacked the website of Sberbank, the largest bank in Russia. The IT Army had also launched attacks on other Russian and Belarusian sites, including the government websites of Russia and Belarus, the FSB and the Belarusian state news agency BelTA, among others.
According to Reuters, the group targets Russian power grids and railways to prevent Russian infrastructure from reaching Ukraine. This included technologies such as GLONASS.
 Eight hundred Russian websites, including Roscosmos, were attacked by the IT Army, from June 27 to July 10. They posted congratulatory messages to Ukrainian Constitution Day on those websites. Besides that, distributed denial of service attacks carried out by the IT army has crippled Russian ability to work on some CRM systems for extended periods.
Ministry of Digital Transformation reported about cyberattacks on over 6000 of Russian web resource in the period from February 26 to July 30.
 In September 2022 the group had reportedly collaborated with Anonymous to commit cyberattack against Yandex Taxi's systems, causing a traffic jam in Moscow.
 The group claimed to have hacked the website of Wagner group and stolen its personal data. On the defaced website, photos of dead soldiers were shown.
 On Oct 7th, the IT Army hacked the website of the Collective Security Treaty Organization (CSTO), through which they congratulated the Russian president on his birthday.

References

External links 

Internet manipulation and propaganda
Reactions to the 2022 Russian invasion of Ukraine
Russian–Ukrainian cyberwarfare